Víctor Ángel Pedro Avendaño (June 5, 1907 in Buenos Aires – July 1, 1984) was an Argentine boxer who competed in the 1928 Summer Olympics.

In 1928 he won the gold medal in the light heavyweight class after winning the final against Ernst Pistulla.

1928 Olympic results
Below is the record of Victor Avendano, an Argentine light heavyweight boxer who competed at the 1928 Amsterdam Olympics:

Round of 16: Defeated Sergio Ojeda (Chile) on points
Quarterfinal: Defeated Donald Carrick (Canada) on points
Semifinal: Defeated Donald McCorkindale (South Africa) on points
Final: Defeated Ernst Pistulla (Germany) on points (won gold medal)

External links
 profile
 

1907 births
1984 deaths
Boxers from Buenos Aires
Argentine male boxers
Light-heavyweight boxers
Olympic boxers of Argentina
Boxers at the 1928 Summer Olympics
Olympic gold medalists for Argentina
Olympic medalists in boxing

Medalists at the 1928 Summer Olympics